Bangladesh is represented at the 2006 Commonwealth Games in Melbourne by a xx-member strong contingent comprising 20 sportspersons and xx officials.

Medals

Silver
 Shooting, Men's 10m Air Rifle Pairs

Nations at the 2006 Commonwealth Games
Commonwealth Games